The 2016 FINA Diving World Cup took place in Rio de Janeiro, Brazil, from 19 to 24 February 2016. It was the 20th edition of the Diving World Cup, and the first time being hosted by Brazil. The venue was the Maria Lenk Aquatic Centre.

The meet served as a test event for the 2016 Olympic Games. The Rio Olympic Games Organising Committee provided mosquito repellent and performed daily cleaning of the venue in response to concerns over the 2015–2016 Zika virus epidemic.

Participating countries 
The number beside each nation represents the number of athletes who competed for each country at the 2016 FINA Diving World Cup.

 (2) 
 (10)
 (2) 
 (5) 
 (11) 
 (8) 
 (4) 
 (13) 
 (5) 
 (1) 
 (1) 
 (1) 

 (6) 
 (3)     
 (2)   
 (4)   
 (11)   
 (2)   
 (9)   
 (1)   
 (3)   
 (3) 
 (2) 
 (9) 

 (1) 
 (7) 
 (7) 
 (2)
 (6) 
 (3)  
 (1) 
 (2) 
 (2) 
 (2) 
 (2) 
 (3) 
  
 (10)   
 (2) 
 (2) 
 (2) 
 (1) 
 (10) 
 (12)   
 (1) 
 (6) 
 (11)

Medal summary
As reported by FINA and Omega Timing.

Men's events

Women's events

Medal table

References

External links 
 FINA Diving World Cup 2016

International sports competitions in Rio de Janeiro (city)
Fina Diving World Cup
FINA Diving World Cup
Fina Diving World Cup
Qualification for the 2016 Summer Olympics
Dive
Diving competitions in Brazil
Diving